Kaja Kreisman (born 20 March 1968 in Kiviõli) is an Estonian politician. She was a member of XII Riigikogu.

References

1968 births
Living people
Isamaa politicians
Members of the Riigikogu, 2011–2015
Women members of the Riigikogu
People from Kiviõli
21st-century Estonian women politicians